Maharajah Sir Ranbir Singh (11 October 1879 – 31 March 1948) was the Maharaja of Jind (Punjab at that time, now Jind city falls in Haryana and the rest of his state is in Punjab). He ruled Jind from 1887 to 1948.

Early life

Singh was born on 11 October 1879 as the only son of Tikka Sri Balbir Singh Sahib Bahadur (1857-1883), the only son of Raghubir Singh of Jind and the heir apparent to the throne of Jind. When Ranbir Singh was four, his father died, and he became the heir. In 1887, his grandfather Raghubir Singh died, and he succeeded him as the Raja of Jind.

Raja and Maharaja

After ruling under a regency for a decade, Singh came of age and was formally installed in 1899. He contributed contingents of the state army to serve with the British in the Tirah Campaign of 1897, the East African campaign during the First World War and in the Third Afghan War of 1919 and the Malayan campaign against the forces of Imperial Japan during the Second World War. Ranbir Singh himself pursued a military career, eventually rising to the rank of Brigadier in the British Army.

A progressive ruler, Singh built schools and hospitals, established charities for widows and orphans and instituted free primary education in Jind. In the 1909 New Year Honours, he was knighted with the KCSI and two years later was granted the hereditary distinction of Maharaja of Jind. He was appointed a GCIE in the 1916 New Year Honours. In 1918, he received the additional title of Rajendra Bahadur; in 1926, he was granted an increased permanent gun salute of 13-guns with a 15-gun local salute. He was appointed a GCSI in 1937.

His inability to rise against the British Monarchy, as a domininant characteristic of the other Phulkian city-states like Patiala, Nabha, Faridkot, etc., eventually led to his lack of dominance and invitation to the town-hall by Sardar (by Title, not inheritance) Patel, which decided the fate of Sikh states joining the Indian union.

He was known as the Bola Raja, or the 'Deaf King', not only about his inability to understand things mentioned to the right side of him, due to a congenital defect, but also due to his attitude of turning his head to ignore any viewpoints that were contrary to his own.

He was known to be impotent, so the section below and the references seem divergent and plausible.

In March 1947, Singh celebrated his Diamond Jubilee, marking 60 years on the throne of Jind-the longest reign of any of the rulers of the Phulkian clan. He signed the Instrument of Accession to the Dominion of India five months later and died on 31 March 1948, aged 68 after a 61-year reign. He was succeeded by his son, Rajbir Singh.

Personal life

Singh married five times, first to Dhelma Kaur, then to Jaswant Kaur (née Olive Monalescu), the daughter of a Romanian barber, third to Deepkumar Kaur and fourth to Gurcharan Kaur. He had 12 children, five sons and seven daughters:
1. An unnamed prince (12 September 1901-March 1902)
2. Dorothy Kaur  (1903-?). Had issue.
3. Dhelma Kaur 
4. Devinderbir Kaur  (daughter of  Deepkumar). Married Air Commodore Narendra Singh, Royal Indian Air Force (1912-1949) and had a son Deepak and a daughter Veera. 
5. Rajbir Singh (25 September 1918 – 7 September 1959), who succeeded as Maharaja of Jind.
6.  Brijinder Kaur  (c1920-2011)(daughter of  Deepkumar) Married Air Commodore Ravindra Hari Darshan Singh, RIAF, IAF (1914-1999) and had a son [Ritindar Singh, b. 1941] and a daughter [Yadvinder Kaur, b.1939], and adopted nephew [Deepak Singh, son of Rajkumari Devinder Bir Kaur].
7. Ruby Rajibir Kaur  (1920-)
8. Diamond Balbir Rajinder Kaur (c1924-)
9. Jagatbir Singh (23 March 1925-). Married Hemalta Raje  (7 March 1923-), daughter of the Raja of Sawantwadi. Has one son Kr. Rambir Singh married to Inderjit Kaur have two sons Kr. Jagbir Singh ( have one daughter Princess Zeeniabir Kaur and son Kr. Royalbir Singh) and Kr. Gajraj Singh ( has one son Kr. Gunbir Singh) one daughter Princess Raminderbir Kaur.
10. Lieutenant-General Jasbir Singh, PVSM (son of Deepkumar) (20 August 1925 – 2010). Commissioned in the Royal Indian Army in 1947, retired in 1984. Married Gita Devi  (1926-2005). Had one son (Brighubir) and a daughter (Ira).
11. Gajinder Bir Singh (son of Deepkumar)(19 January 1927 – 2010). Married Champa Singh (14 August 19) One son (Jitender Bir Singh) One granddaughter (Malvika Singh) & One grandson (Sumer Bir Singh).
12. Taranbir Kaur  (daughter of  Deepkumar)(1931-). Married Air Commodore Jagdish Chandra Verma, DFC (3 July 1918-). and had a son(Ajay) and a daughter (Tina).

Titles

1879-1883: Rajkumar Sri Ranbir Singh
1883-1887: Sri Tikka Sahib Ranbir Singh Bahadur
1887-1909: His Highness Farzand-i-Dilband, Rasikh ul-Itiqad-i- Daulat-i-Inglishia, Raja-i-Rajgan, Raja Sri Ranbir Singh Bahadur, Raja of Jind
1909-1911: His Highness Farzand-i-Dilband, Rasikh ul-Itiqad-i- Daulat-i-Inglishia, Raja-i-Rajgan, Raja Sri Sir Ranbir Singh Bahadur, Raja of Jind, KCSI
1911-1916: His Highness Farzand-i-Dilband, Rasikh ul-Itiqad-i- Daulat-i-Inglishia, Raja-i-Rajgan, Maharaja Sri Sir Ranbir Singh Bahadur, Maharaja of Jind, KCSI
1916-1918: His Highness Farzand-i-Dilband, Rasikh ul-Itiqad-i- Daulat-i-Inglishia, Raja-i-Rajgan, Maharaja Sri Sir Ranbir Singh Bahadur, Maharaja of Jind, GCIE, KCSI
1918-1926: Lieutenant-Colonel His Highness Farzand-i-Dilband, Rasikh ul-Itiqad-i- Daulat-i-Inglishia, Raja-i-Rajgan, Maharaja Sri Sir Ranbir Singh Rajendra Bahadur, Maharaja of Jind, GCIE, KCSI
1926-1937: Colonel His Highness Farzand-i-Dilband, Rasikh ul-Itiqad-i- Daulat-i-Inglishia, Raja-i-Rajgan, Maharaja Sri Sir Ranbir Singh Rajendra Bahadur, Maharaja of Jind, GCIE, KCSI
1937-1943: Colonel His Highness Farzand-i-Dilband, Rasikh ul-Itiqad-i- Daulat-i-Inglishia, Raja-i-Rajgan, Maharaja Sri Sir Ranbir Singh Rajendra Bahadur, Maharaja of Jind, GCSI, GCIE
1943-1948: Brigadier His Highness Farzand-i-Dilband, Rasikh ul-Itiqad-i- Daulat-i-Inglishia, Raja-i-Rajgan, Maharaja Sri Sir Ranbir Singh Rajendra Bahadur, Maharaja of Jind, GCSI, GCIE

Honours 

Delhi Durbar gold medal-1903
Delhi Durbar gold medal-1911
Knight Grand Commander of the Order of the Indian Empire (GCIE)-1916
King George V Silver Jubilee Medal-1935
King George VI Coronation Medal-1937
Knight Grand Commander of the Order of the Star of India (GCSI)-1937  (KCSI-1909)
Indian Independence Medal-1947

References

Indian knights
Indian Sikhs
Maharajas of Punjab, India
Knights Grand Commander of the Order of the Star of India
Knights Grand Commander of the Order of the Indian Empire
1879 births
1948 deaths
People from Jind
Punjabi people